Roy Michael Collins (21 May 1922 – 25 December 1979) was an English television actor. He appeared in many British television series and films, which include Quatermass II, The Adventures of the Scarlet Pimpernel, The Adventures of Robin Hood, The Avengers, No Hiding Place, Emergency – Ward 10, Z-Cars, Goldfinger, The Saint, Danger Man, The Newcomers, Bear Island and others.

It was later revealed that he did most of the uncredited English-language dubbing for Gert Fröbe's appearances in many of his films such as Chitty Chitty Bang Bang and Goldfinger.

Acting credits

References

External links

1922 births
1979 deaths
English male television actors
20th-century English male actors
People from Isleworth